Kicking & Screaming is a 2005 American sports comedy film directed by Jesse Dylan and written by Leo Benvenuti and Steve Rudnick. The film stars Will Ferrell and Robert Duvall as a father and son who exploit their own sons' soccer teams to try and beat the other. Mike Ditka, Kate Walsh and Josh Hutcherson also star. It was released on May 13, 2005, to mixed reviews and grossed $56 million worldwide.

Plot
Phil Weston, is an average person who had to endure his father Buck Weston's over-competitiveness throughout his childhood, an upbringing which has left permanent mental scars. Now middle-aged and married, with a young son named Sam, Phil runs a small vitamin store, while Buck operates a local chain of sports stores.

Buck is coach of the Gladiators, the most successful little-league soccer team in the district. Sam is on Buck's soccer team, but to his dad's annoyance his grandfather keeps him on the bench, a humiliation he also visited upon his son decades prior. Buck eventually transfers Sam to the Tigers, the league's worst team.

At Sam's first game with his new team their coach is absent. Rather than forfeit, Phil decides to coach the team, a position he takes up permanently. However, despite Phil's best efforts the team does not seem to improve. In desperation Phil recruits Mike Ditka, who is Buck's neighbor and hated enemy. Enticed by the opportunity to beat Buck, Ditka accepts the position. Despite grueling training, the team continues to lose.

Ditka introduces Phil to two exceptionally talented Italian boys working in a local butcher's shop. Phil succeeds in gaining their Uncle's permission for them to play for the Tigers. They have an immediate impact, scoring repeatedly. The resulting winning streak makes them serious contenders in the league. After finally winning a couple of games and Phil said that his team was going to go to the finals, Phil and Buck make a bet, if the Gladiators win then Phil would sell his store and work for Buck. If the Tigers win then Buck would hand over his most prized possession, 'The Pelé Ball', a soccer ball struck by the famous player which Phil caught as a child and Buck took from him.

Meanwhile, Ditka also introduces Phil to coffee, which rapidly changes him from a mild-mannered caring dad, to an obnoxious, egotistical, over-competitive coach, not that different from his father, abusing kids and parents alike. The team's mantra becomes "Get the ball to the Italians", which, though effective, demoralizes his team. In the ultimate over-competitive act he benches his own son for the entire semi-final game.

The Tigers make it to the finals where they face off against the Gladiators. At half-time, the score is two-one to the Gladiators. In a heart-to-heart discussion with his son, Phil realizes the error of his ways. He tells his team to do exactly the opposite of what he taught them. Although the Gladiators score one more goal after half-time, they don't give up hope. Phil gives the goalie a vision test with glasses from the crowd. From there, Ambrose scores one goal—making the score three-two. After another goal, the score is tied. The team rallies and produces a spectacular team performance to win 4–3, with Sam scoring the winning goal against his uncle Bucky, (Buck's child from his second wife and Phil's younger half-brother, who was born on the exact day as Sam) using a move that he practiced when his dad benched him in the semi-finals.

Honoring the bet, Buck tries to give Phil the ball, but Phil refuses. Making peace with his father, they merge their businesses, realizing there is more to life than winning.

The film ends with an adapted version of the "He's Got Balls" commercial originally produced by Buck. In it, the entire Tigers team appear, announcing the merger of Phil's vitamin shop—Phil's Pills—and Buck's Sporting Goods Store. The team shouts, after the "He's got balls" line, "And vitamins."

Cast

Reception

Critical response
On Rotten Tomatoes, the film holds an approval rating of 41% based on 139 reviews, and an average rating of 5.5/10. The web site's critical consensus reads, "The script is mediocre and fails to give Ferrell a proper comedic showcase." On Metacritic, the film has a weighted average score of 45 out of 100, based on 33 critics, indicating "mixed or average reviews". Audiences polled by CinemaScore gave the film an average grade of "B" on an A+ to F scale.

Roger Ebert gave the film 3 out of 4 stars, saying that it was "An entertaining family movie, and may serve a useful purpose if it inspires kids to overthrow their coaches and take over their own sports." Scott Foundas of Variety called it "An immensely likable, funny comedy that finds a novel approach to that familiar combo of kids and sports."
David Palmer gave the film 3.5 out of 5 stars, saying that Ferrell and the film were much funnier than "a PG-rated kids film has any right being".

Box office
The film grossed $20.2 million in its opening weekend, finishing in 2nd place behind fellow newcomer Monster-in-Law ($23.1 million).

Kicking and Screaming earned $52.8 million in the U.S. and Canada, and $3.2 million in other territories for a worldwide total $56.1 million, against a production budget of $45 million. Kicking and Screaming became the highest grossing soccer movie, beating Bend It Like Beckham which grossed $32.5 million.

Awards and nominations

Golden Raspberry Awards
 Will Ferrell nominated for Worst Actor (also for Bewitched)

Teen Choice Awards
 Choice Movie, Actor: Ferrell nominated for Comedy (also for Anchorman: The Legend of Ron Burgundy)
 Choice Movie, Hissy Fit: Ferrell
 2005: Choice Movie Sleazebag: Ferrell

References

External links

 
 
 

2005 films
American association football films
2005 LGBT-related films
2000s sports comedy films
Universal Pictures films
Films shot in California
Films directed by Jesse Dylan
American LGBT-related films
American sports comedy films
Films scored by Mark Isham
American children's comedy films
2005 comedy films
2000s English-language films
2000s American films